Sverre Lunde Pedersen (born 17 July 1992) is a Norwegian speed skater. He is the son of former speed-skater Jarle Pedersen.

Career
He is a two-time World Junior Champion and represents the club Fana Idrettslag.

In 2011 he was 6th in the European Championships in Collalbo and 14th in the World Championships in Calgary. In 2012 he finished 7th at the European Championships, with 2nd place in the 1500 m, and 8th at the World Championships.

At the 2014 Winter Olympics in Sochi he finished 5th on the 5000 m. At the 2018 Winter Olympics he partnered compatriots Håvard Bøkko, Simen Spieler Nilsen and Sindre Henriksen to win the gold medal in the men's team pursuit.

At the 2018 World Championship in Allround Skating in Amsterdam, Sverre won the silver medal after falling from a clear leadership position in the last competition, 10,000-meter. But for the fall, Sverre would have most likely been Norway's first World Champion in Allround Skating since Johann Olav Koss in 1994.

Development

Personal records

He is currently in 5th position in the adelskalender with 145.561 points.

References

External links
 
 
 

1992 births
Norwegian male speed skaters
Speed skaters at the 2010 Winter Olympics
Speed skaters at the 2014 Winter Olympics
Speed skaters at the 2018 Winter Olympics
Speed skaters at the 2022 Winter Olympics
Olympic speed skaters of Norway
Sportspeople from Bergen
Living people
Medalists at the 2018 Winter Olympics
Medalists at the 2022 Winter Olympics
Olympic medalists in speed skating
Olympic gold medalists for Norway
Olympic bronze medalists for Norway
World Allround Speed Skating Championships medalists
World Single Distances Speed Skating Championships medalists
21st-century Norwegian people